Kikai Labs was an Argentinian company that produced 3D printers until late 2016, when it went bankrupt due to poor financial management.

Awards
The company has received the following awards:

 RioInfo 2012 (Argentina) -  Award given as the local winner in the Argentine chapter. The award was a paid trip to compete in the national RioInfo conference in Brazil.
 Semi-finalist in Innovar 2013, 2014, 2015 - This competition, hosted by the Argentine government, showcases inventions and grants monetary prizes. Selected competitors, such as Kikai Labs, are invited to the exhibition.

References

Argentine brands
3D printer companies